Westpreussen may refer to:

 West Prussia - A former region of Germany
 Westpreussen (glider), A glider designed and built by Heinrich Hoffmann in Germany during 1927